Rahu is one of the navagrahas (nine planets) in Vedic astrology.

Rahu may also refer to:

 Rahu, Saaremaa, a village in Valjala Commune, Saare County, Estonia
 Rahu River, a river in the Tasman Region, South Island, New Zealand 
 Renters and Housing Union, a syndicalist tenants union based in Australia

See also
 Ruha, queen of the World of Darkness in Mandaeism